The 1999 South Australian Soccer Federation season was the 93rd season of soccer in South Australia.

1999 SASF Premier League

The 1999 South Australian Premier League season was the top level domestic association football competition in South Australia for 1999. It was contested by 12 teams in a single 22 round league format, each team playing all of their opponents twice.

Finals

1999 SASF State League

The 1999 South Australian State League season was the second highest domestic level association football competition in South Australia. It was contested by 13 teams in a 26 round league format, each team playing all of their opponents twice.

Finals

See also
1999 SASF Premier League
1999 SASF State League
National Premier Leagues South Australia
Football Federation South Australia

References

1999 in Australian soccer
Football South Australia seasons